The Sitte (Siitte) is a river in Yakutia (Sakha Republic), Russia.

The name of the river is based on the Yakut word "satyy" (сатыы), meaning "low".

Course  
The Sitte has its sources in a marshy area near Kiriyestyakh, at the northern edge of the Lena Plateau. It soon leaves the plateau area and flows across the Central Yakutian Lowland in a roughly northern direction. The river forms meanders as it heads north within a floodplain with oxbows and small thermokarst lakes to the east of the Tyugyuene and west of the Khanchaly. Close to the final stretch of its course the Sitte enters the Lena floodplain, dotted with a multitude of larger lakes and marshes. Finally it meets an arm of the left bank of the Lena,  from its mouth. 

The Sitte river is fed by rain and snow. Floods are common in the spring, but the rest of the warm season its channel is shallow and it may dry in stretches. Parts of the upper course are often encumbered by logs and fallen trees.

The river basin is largely uninhabited territory, except for Bes-Kyuyel, a small Yakut settlement.

Tributaries 
The river freezes between the second half of October and mid May.

Flora and fauna
The vegetation of the Sitte basin is mainly spruce and larch taiga. There are also birch forests in some areas of the Sitte's lower course. The basin is prone to forest fires in some years.

The main fish species are pike, perch and common roach, among others. Elk, wild reindeer, roe deer, wolf, hare, sable, muskrat and many other animals are common in the Tugyuene basin.

See also
List of rivers of Russia

References

External links 
Fishing in the Sitte
Fishing & Tourism in Yakutia

Rivers of the Sakha Republic
Central Yakutian Lowland